The Demopolis Historic Business District, currently officially known as Demopolis Historic District, is a historic district in the city of Demopolis, Alabama, United States.  Demopolis had its beginnings in 1817 with the Vine and Olive Colony.  The historic district is a ten block area, roughly bounded by Capitol Street, Franklin Street, Desnouettes Street, and Cedar Avenue.

The district boundaries were increased, and name was changed to the actual one in October 2014.

References

National Register of Historic Places in Marengo County, Alabama
Historic districts in Marengo County, Alabama
Buildings and structures in Demopolis, Alabama
Historic districts on the National Register of Historic Places in Alabama